Dandolu Chennareddy (1833–?) was born/raised at Danda-Volu village, Kadapa district, Andhra Pradesh, India.

He was married with children: a daughter Dandolu Narasamma, and sons Dandolu Ramireddy & Dandolu Saiappareddy.

Background and uprising
After the British increased the tax on his tobacco estate, which Chennareddy disliked, he decided to oppose the rule with the guidelines of his brother-in-law of Uyyalawada Narasimha Reddy. Thus later partial estate became part of British India.

Reign
He was the head of Rapuru subdivision (samantha raja) and in command of 11 villages around Rapuru, lived in Pokura Palli, a small village near Venkatagiri, now part of Nellore District. He built many water ponds and wells for farming and villagers, which still exist around Kandaleru Dam. He was a devotee of Ankamma talli Goddess Laxmi.

He was also a revenue minister for Venkatigiri Raja Maharaja Sir Rajagopala Krishna Yachendra

He personalized a popular song in region "auyra chennappareddy nee pera bangarakaddi..."  This song is still popular as praise song.

He belongs to category of Pakanati Reddy Pakanati group, few popular people who are popular in this group Neelam Sanjiva Reddy, AC Subbareddy

Modern history

Monuments
Reddy's primary house and cow shelters later in the 1950s became a primary school (up to 5th grade) in Pokurapalli.
His farmland, estates were left by his hereditary to the relatives and villagers to farm and later gone under Kandaleru Dam

References

Venkatagiri Asthanam, Government issued history book (pages 152,153)

Indian independence activists from Andhra Pradesh
People from Kadapa district
1833 births
Year of death unknown